Liourdis is a Greek surname. Notable people with the surname include:

Ioannis Liourdis (1800–1899), Greek politician
Giannis Liourdis (born 1979), Greek footballer and coach

Greek-language surnames